This is a list of windmills in Denmark.

Bornholm
See List of windmills on Bornholm

Funen and South Funen Archipelago

Lolland-Falster and surrounding islands

Zealand

Other

See also
Lists of wind turbines in Denmark

Notes

Surviving mills are in bold. Known building dates are in bold text. Non-bold text denotes first known date.

References

Denmark
 
Windmills